In numerical analysis, interpolative decomposition (ID) factors a matrix as the product of two matrices, one of which contains selected columns from the original matrix, and the other of which has a subset of columns consisting of the identity matrix and all its values are no greater than 2 in absolute value.

Definition 
Let  be an  matrix of rank .  The matrix  can be written as

where
  is a subset of  indices from 
 The  matrix  represents 's columns of 
  is an  matrix, all of whose values are less than 2 in magnitude.   has an  identity submatrix.

Note that a similar decomposition can be done using the rows of  instead of its columns.

Example 
Let  be the  matrix of rank 2:

If

then

Notes

References 
 Cheng, Hongwei, Zydrunas Gimbutas, Per-Gunnar Martinsson, and Vladimir Rokhlin. "On the compression of low rank matrices." SIAM Journal on Scientific Computing 26, no. 4 (2005): 1389–1404.
 Liberty, E., Woolfe, F., Martinsson, P. G., Rokhlin, V., & Tygert, M. (2007). Randomized algorithms for the low-rank approximation of matrices. Proceedings of the National Academy of Sciences, 104(51), 20167–20172.

Matrix decompositions
Numerical linear algebra